Małgorzata Kawalska (born 18 February 1952) is a Polish rower. She competed in the women's coxless pair event at the 1976 Summer Olympics.

References

1952 births
Living people
Polish female rowers
Olympic rowers of Poland
Rowers at the 1976 Summer Olympics
Sportspeople from Łódź